The Critics' Choice Movie Award for Best Actor is an award given out at the annual Critics' Choice Movie Awards. The awards are presented by the Critics Choice Association (CCA) and was first presented in 1995. There were no official nominees announced until 2001. Actors Russell Crowe and Daniel Day-Lewis hold the record for most wins in this category with three victories each, followed by Jack Nicholson and Sean Penn with two wins each.

This is the main Best Actor award for leading performances by an actor. Previously, two other genre-specific categories were presented: Best Actor in a Comedy (2012–2019) and Best Actor in an Action Movie (2012–2016).

For the Supporting Actor category, see Critics' Choice Movie Award for Best Supporting Actor.

Winners and nominees

1990s

2000s

2010s

2020s

Multiple nominees

2 nominations
 Christian Bale
 Jeff Bridges
 Bradley Cooper
 Benedict Cumberbatch
 Michael Fassbender
 Colin Firth
 James Franco
 Andrew Garfield
 Jake Gyllenhaal
 Jack Nicholson
 Gary Oldman
 Brad Pitt
 Eddie Redmayne

3 nominations
 George Clooney
 Viggo Mortensen
 Sean Penn
 Joaquin Phoenix
 Will Smith
 Denzel Washington

4 nominations
 Daniel Day-Lewis
 Johnny Depp
 Tom Hanks

5 nominations
 Russell Crowe

6 nominations
 Leonardo DiCaprio
 Ryan Gosling

Multiple winners
3 wins
 Daniel Day-Lewis
 Russell Crowe (consecutive)

2 wins
 Jack Nicholson
 Sean Penn

See also
 Academy Award for Best Actor
 Independent Spirit Award for Best Male Lead
 BAFTA Award for Best Actor in a Leading Role
 Golden Globe Award for Best Actor – Motion Picture Drama
 Golden Globe Award for Best Actor – Motion Picture Musical or Comedy
 Screen Actors Guild Award for Outstanding Performance by a Male Actor in a Leading Role

References

External links
 Official website

A
Film awards for lead actor